Erlun Township is a rural township in Yunlin County, Taiwan. It has a population total of 25,183 and an area of 59.5625 square kilometres.

Name

The name Erlun came from the fact that the area consists of two connected hills.

History
Early residents of Erlun came from Jinjiang and Zhao'an in Fujian, China.

Geography

Administrative divisions
The township comprises 18 villages: Dahua, Datong, Dayi, Dazhuang, Dingan, Fuxing, Ganghou, Laihui, Lundong, Lunxi, Nanzi, Sanhe, Tianwei, Yangxian, Yizhuang, Yongding, Youche and Zhuangxi.

Tourist attractions
 Erlun Sports Park
 Erlun Story House

References

Townships in Yunlin County